Ragazzi della notte is a 1995 Italian comedy-drama film directed by Jerry Calà.

Cast

References

External links

1995 films
Films directed by Jerry Calà
1990s Italian-language films
1995 comedy-drama films
Italian comedy-drama films
1990s Italian films